Ghorveh County is in Kurdistan province, Iran. The capital of the county is the city of Ghorveh. At the 2006 census, the county's population was 196,972 in 47,214 households. The following census in 2011 counted 136,961 people in 38,161 households, by which time Yeylan District had been separated from the county to become Dehgolan County. At the 2016 census, the county's population was 140,192 in 42,905 households.

Administrative divisions

The population history and structural changes of Ghorveh County's administrative divisions over three consecutive censuses are shown in the following table. The latest census shows four districts, 10 rural districts, and four cities.

References

 

Counties of Kurdistan Province